The 1946 Arizona State–Flagstaff Lumberjacks football team was an American football team that represented Arizona State College at Flagstaff (now known as Northern Arizona University) in the Border Conference during the 1946 college football season. In their fourth and final year under head coach Frank Brickey, the team compiled a 5–2–2 record (1–2–1 against conference opponents), outscored opponents by a total of 130 to 70, and finished in sixth place out of nine teams in the Border Conference.

The team played its home games at Skidmore Field in Flagstaff, Arizona.

Schedule

References

Arizona State-Flagstaff
Northern Arizona Lumberjacks football seasons
Arizona State-Flagstaff Lumberjacks football